Temple is a station on Paris Métro Line 3, located in the 3rd arrondissement of Paris.

Location
The station is located under Rue de Turbigo at its exit on Rue du Temple, nearby Place Élisabeth-Dmitrieff. Oriented along a northeast–southwest axis, it is located between the Arts et Métiers and République stations, the latter being geographically very close to it.

History
It opened on 19 October 1904 as part of the first section of the line opened between Père Lachaise and Villiers.

It is named after the Temple, a long-demolished Templar fortification that once stood in the square named after it. It is the only Paris Metro station to share its name with a station on the London Underground.

As part of the RATP's Renouveau du métro program, the entire station was renovated by 29 October 2003.

In 2018, 1,258,217 travelers entered this station which places it at 209th position of the metro stations for its usage out of 302.

Passenger services

Access
The station has a single entrance entitled Place Élisabeth-Dmitrieff, leading to said square formed by the corner of Rue du Temple and Rue de Turbigo (named in honor of Elisabeth Dmitrieff on 8 March 2007, International Women's Day). Consisting of a fixed staircase, it is adorned with a Guimard entrance, which is the subject of registration as a historic monuments by a decree of 29 May 1978.

Between the entry and the access corridors to the platform, a mosaic by the French artist Hervé Mathieu-Bachelot has been installed since 1982: Couleur en masses.

Station layout

Platforms
Temple is a standard configuration station. It has two platforms separated by the metro tracks and the vault is elliptical. The decoration is in the style used for most metro stations, the lighting canopies are white and rounded in the Gaudin style of the renouveau du métro des années 2000s, and the bevelled white ceramic tiles cover the walls, the vault, the tunnel exits and the outlets of the corridors. The advertising frames are in white ceramic and the name of the station is written in Parisine font on enamelled plates. The platforms are equipped with benches made of wooden slats.

Bus connections
The station is served by lines 20 and 75 of the RATP Bus Network and, at night, by lines N12 and N23 of the Noctilien network.

Nearby attractions
 Place de la République
 Church of Sainte-Élisabeth-de-Hongrie
 Carreau du Temple (covered market)
 Square du Temple (park)
 Town hall of the 3rd arrondissement
 École supérieure des arts appliqués Duperré (Duperré College of Applied Arts)

References

Roland, Gérard (2003). Stations de métro. D’Abbesses à Wagram. Éditions Bonneton.

Paris Métro stations in the 3rd arrondissement of Paris
Railway stations in France opened in 1904